Alaskans Together for Equality is a statewide education and political advocacy organization in Alaska that advocates for lesbian, gay, bisexual, and transgender (LGBT) rights, including same-sex marriage.

History 
Alaskans Together for Equality began in January 2007 as Alaskans Together, a ballot measure committee organized to oppose an advisory vote intended to deny public employees access to same-sex partner benefits. Following the vote, the organization adopted its current structure.

Structure 
Alaskans Together for Equality is a 501(c)(4) nonprofit organization which lobbies at the local, state, and federal levels of government on LGBT issues.

Alaskans Together Foundation, Inc. is a 501(c)(3) nonprofit organization which educates the public on LGBT issues.

Activities 
Alaskans Together for Equality endorses candidates for political office and engages in lobbying on LGBT rights.

Alaskans Together Foundation, Inc. coordinates public awareness campaigns on LGBT issues.

The organization is a member of the Equality Federation.

See also 

 LGBT rights in Alaska
 List of LGBT rights organizations
 Same-sex marriage in Alaska

References

External links 
 

2007 establishments in Alaska
Equality Federation
LGBT political advocacy groups in Alaska
Non-profit organizations based in Alaska
Organizations based in Anchorage, Alaska
Organizations established in 2007
501(c)(4) nonprofit organizations